80s BC is the time period from 89 BC – 80 BC.

References